The Nagaland cricket team is a cricket team that represents the state of Nagaland in Indian domestic competitions. In July 2018, the Board of Control for Cricket in India (BCCI) named the team as one of the nine new sides that would compete in domestic tournaments for the 2018–19 season, including the Ranji Trophy and the Vijay Hazare Trophy. However, the Telangana Cricket Association questioned the decision to include the team in the Ranji Trophy, stating that there should be qualification criteria to allow a team to compete. Ahead of the 2018–19 season, Kanwaljit Singh was appointed as the team's coach.

In September 2018, they lost their opening fixture of the 2018–19 Vijay Hazare Trophy, to Bihar, by 8 wickets. In their first season in the Vijay Hazare Trophy, they finished in fourth place in the Plate Group, with five wins and three defeats from their eight matches. KB Pawan finished as the leading run-scorer, with 432 runs, and Imliwati Lemtur was the leading wicket-taker for the team, with ten dismissals.

In November 2018, in their opening match of the 2018–19 Ranji Trophy, they beat Mizoram by an innings and 333 runs. It was the biggest winning margin for a team making its debut in the Ranji Trophy. They finished the 2018–19 tournament seventh in the table, with two wins from their eight matches.

In March 2019, Nagaland finished in last place in Group A of the 2018–19 Syed Mushtaq Ali Trophy, with no wins from their six matches. Rongsen Jonathan was the leading run-scorer for the team in the tournament, with 121 runs, and Pawan Suyal was the leading wicket-taker, with three dismissals.

In July 2019, ahead of the 2019–20 cricket season, the Nagaland Cricket Association (NCA) released three outstation players, Pawan Suyal, K. B. Pawan and Abrar Kazi, following poor performances in the Syed Mushtaq Ali Trophy.

Squad

Updated as on 24 January 2023

See also
List of Nagaland cricketers

References

Indian first-class cricket teams
Cricket in Nagaland
2018 establishments in Nagaland
Cricket clubs established in 2018